The Bluenose Squash Classic 2014 is the 2014's Bluenose Classic, which is a tournament of the PSA World Tour. The event took place in Halifax in Canada from 29 October to 1 November. Peter Barker won his first Bluenose Squash Classic trophy, beating Miguel Ángel Rodríguez in the final.

Prize money and ranking points
For 2014, the prize purse was $50,000. The prize money and points breakdown is as follows:

Seeds

Draw and results

See also
PSA World Tour 2014
Bluenose Classic

References

External links
PSA Bluenose Squash Classic 2014 website

Squash tournaments in Canada
Bluenose Squash Classic
Bluenose Squash Classic
Bluenose Squash Classic
Bluenose Squash Classic